The LoveCrave is an Italian gothic metal band from Milan. The LoveCrave (originally Love-C-Rave, with Roman numeral C) means "Hundredth Rave of Love". This name was taken from a story about a rave of vampires written by Francesca Chiara in 2003.

Biography
The band is formed of two experienced rock musicians from Milan and two old friends of Venetian origin that moved to Milan to make music.

Tank Palamara, guitarist and producer, has ten years of tours and rock productions experience.

Singer Francesca Chiara is in charge of the graphics and invented "Rain", her 3D alter-ego. Being a born writer, she wrote a fictional story ("The Angel and the Rain") that pieces all the songs together and is included in the band's debut album booklet.

Iakk has been playing drums with Tank and Francesca for about six years and usually takes care of the live sets and rehearsals.

Simon Dredo, Francesca's best friend from high school, was the last to join the band as bass player in March 2005 after a tour in England, just in time to record the bass parts for the songs.

Tank and Francesca, co-writers for many years, wrote about 15 songs in less than a month and that’s how a live metal band becomes a serious project aiming to the music industry. 
What the LoveCrave were looking for during the recordings was "a rough, elegant and new sound". They took inspiration also from Iron Maiden and eighties sound to the Depeche Mode. They created in their mind a sort of Blade Runner world and tried to put music in it.

In March 2006 they signed with the German record label Repo Records that started making plans for the release of The Angel And The Rain. In May 2006 the band signed with WOD, one of the biggest gothic/metal booking agencies in Europe. In June 2006 the mastering of the album was done by Alex Klier at LXK Studios, Munich and in August the band left for a pre-release German tour with The Birthday Massacre, a Canadian band. He played since 2007 all 4 months in his hometown Milan in the Club Alcatraz.

The Angel And The Rain finally hit the stores on October 31, 2006.

English radio station TotalRock gave the band the chance to play in London in January 2007 at Camden Underworld. The day before the show The LoveCrave recorded 4 unplugged tracks at the Sonic Studio of TotalRock.

On May 7, 2007 the band announced a change in the lineup: Iakk was replaced by Bob The Machine Parolin. In the same month The LoveCrave got a spot at the WGT Festival of Leipzig.

In November 2007 the band won an award as Best Italian Band on International Ground at the MEI (Independent Labels Meeting) presented by the Italian music magazine Rock Sound.

On July 22, 2008 Bob The Machine Parolin became official endorser of Sabian Cymbals.

The LoveCrave are currently working on their second album and are scheduled to play some shows in Italy and Germany during 2008, at the Festival NCN 2008 presents the song Scream from the upcoming Album  and later played at Amphi Festival in Cologne.

The new album will released in March 2010 the songs are recorded in December 2009 at Musicay Studio and Remaster Studio, the Disc will be released from Repo Records, Soul Saliva will released after three years hard work on 14 May 2010, the first single which was released over his MySpace page was the Cover of Michael Jacksons cult song Thriller.

On 15 October 2010 the band released the Crisalide, which features remixes from the both albums The Angel and the Rain and Soul Saliva.

Style 
The music style of the LoveCrave is a mix of gothic, 80's hard rock, metal, darkwave and electropop. Usually the band is classified in the gothic metal genre, but they do not feel comfortable there due to the variety of inspiration. Thus they usually describe their style as modern rock.

Band logo 

The Brokenheart is the symbol of The LoveCrave. According to Francesca, the meaning is "...the two faces of life: when the darkness meets the light there comes a sort of electricity that creates the magic..." Rain is a 3D character surrounding the band that is found on CD covers. She looks like Francesca but "she is the other me, the angry one, the fake one, the bad one, she's the one I am on stage and I hate her."

Titles 
In 2006 rockeyez.com named The Angel And The Rain in the top 10 releases of the year and also listed them in the top 5 best new bands of the year.

Line-up

Current members 

Francesca Chiara – vocals
Tank Palamara – guitars
Simon Dredo – bass
Bob "The Machine" Parolin – drums

Former members 

 Iakk – drums (until May 2007)

Discography

Albums 

2006 – The Angel And The Rain (Repo Records)
2010 – Soul Saliva

Singles 

2008 – "Little Suicide (Acoustic Version)" (download only)
2009 – "Lost" (Remix for Dope Stars Inc.)
2010 – "Thriller"  (download only)

EPs 
2010 – Crisalide

Collections 
2006 – Zilloscope 11/06 (ZILLO mag – DE) – "Little Suicide"
2006 – Cold Hands Seduction Vol.64 (SONIC SEDUCER mag – DE) – "Vampires (The Light That We Are)"
2006 – Loud Sounds (ROCK HARD mag – ITA) – "Nobody"
2006 – ClubTRAX Vol. 2 Double CD (XtraX store – DE) – "Little Suicide"
2007 – Rock Sound Magazine Collection 103 (ROCK SOUND mag – ITA) – "Can You Hear Me?"
2007 – Gothic Magazine Compilation – "Can You Hear Me?"
2007 – Summer Darkness 07 (ZILLO mag – DE) – "Can You Hear Me?"
2007 – Fuck The Mainstream – "Little Suicide"
2007 – Nerodom Compilation – "Vampires (The Light That We Are)" "Remixed By Victor Love / Dope Stars Inc.)"

DVDs 
2006 – Zillo DVD "Dark Visions" – Fading Roses – Soundtrack
2007 – Zillo DVD "Dark Visions 2" – Can You Hear Me? – Live at M'era Luna Festival
2007 – Zillo DVD "Dark Visions 2" – Can You Hear Me? – Soundtrack

Videos

Music videos

Festivals 
2007: Camden Underworld London
2007: WGT Festival
2007: M'era Luna Festival
2008: NCN

References

External links
 

Italian gothic metal musical groups
Musical groups from Milan
Musical quartets